Vikki is a given name. It can be a nickname for the given name Victoria. Notable people with the name include:

 Vikki, a UK singer in the 1985 Eurovision Song Contest, now known as Aeone
 Vikki Bunce (born 1983), field hockey forward
 Vikki Carr (born 1941), American singer
 Vikki de Vries (born 1964), American figure skater
 Vikki Hubbard (born 1989), English high jumper 
 Vikki LaMotta (1930–2005), American model
 Vikki McGinn (born 1985), Irish rugby union player
 Vikki Moss (born 1962), Canadian singer
 Vikki Mongeon (born 1981), American model and television personality
 Vikki Petraitis (born 1965), Australian true crime author
 Vikki Slowe (born 1947), English printmaker and painter
 Vikki Stone (born 1985), English stand-up comedian, actress and musician
 Vikki Thorn, Australian harmonica player, guitarist, vocalist, and songwriter
 Vikki Wakefield (born 1970), Australian young adult fiction writer